This is a list of the National Register of Historic Places listings in Roosevelt County, New Mexico.

This is intended to be a complete list of the properties and districts on the National Register of Historic Places in Roosevelt County, New Mexico, United States. Latitude and longitude coordinates are provided for many National Register properties and districts; these locations may be seen together in a map.

There are 7 properties listed on the National Register in the county, including 1 National Historic Landmark.

Current listings

|}

See also

 List of National Historic Landmarks in New Mexico
 National Register of Historic Places listings in New Mexico

References

Roosevelt